Brendan Colleran (born 1948 in Mountbellew, County Galway) is an Irish former sportsperson. He played Gaelic football with his local club Mountbellew and was a member of the Galway senior inter-county team in the 1970s.  Colleran is one of a small number of Galway players who lost three All-Ireland finals in four years.

References

1948 births
Living people
Mountbellew Gaelic footballers
Galway inter-county Gaelic footballers
Connacht inter-provincial Gaelic footballers